Connie Francis sings Bacharach & David is studio album recorded by American entertainer Connie Francis. The album features a collection of songs written by the legendary 1960s songwriting duo Burt Bacharach and Hal David.

Francis had already begun to work on this project in April 1968 under the musical supervision of Teddy Randazzo, a former fellow high school student. Unsatisfied with Randazzo's working methods, Francis had abandoned the project after recording only three songs.

The project was picked up again in October 1968 when Francis teamed up with Claus Ogerman with whom she had collaborated previously during the recording of the songs for her movie Looking for Love in late 1963 and early 1964.

Released in November 1968, Connie Francis sings Bacharach & David is the first album by Francis on MGM Records released exclusively in stereo. All previous albums had either been released in both stereo and mono or exclusively in mono. In 1979 Polydor Records released a two-record set of this album together with the Connie Francis Sings the Songs of Les Reed album.

Track listing

Side A

Side B

Recordings from the abandoned collaboration with Teddy Randazzo

References

Connie Francis albums
MGM Records albums
1968 albums
Tribute albums
Albums arranged by Claus Ogerman
Albums conducted by Claus Ogerman
Albums produced by Claus Ogerman
Burt Bacharach tribute albums